Dark Passion Play is the sixth studio album by Finnish symphonic power metal quintet Nightwish, released on September 26, 2007 in Finland, September 28 in Europe and October 2, 2007 in the United States. It was the first Nightwish album with the band's new lead singer, Anette Olzon, and the first album not featuring former vocalist Tarja Turunen, who was dismissed in October 2005. Lead songwriter Tuomas Holopainen has referred to it as the 'album that saved his life'.

Track listing

Standard edition

Special editions
Nuclear Blast, Spinefarm Records and Roadrunner Records each released special editions that included an instrumental version of the album, which contain instruments that are hard to hear, or are omitted, from the original version of the album.

Nuclear Blast special 3-CD gold box
In addition to a second disc containing an instrumental version of the album, a third disc was included containing these bonus tracks:

 "Escapist"
 "Meadows of Heaven" (orchestral version)
 "The Poet and the Pendulum" (demo version)

Platinum edition
Instead of instrumental tracks, the second disc featured a collection of B-Sides from the singles "The Islander", Bye Bye Beautiful, and "Erämaan viimeinen", excluding only the instrumental version of Escapist.

 Erämaan Viimeinen
 Escapist
 Meadows of Heaven (orchestral version)
 The Poet and the Pendulum (demo version)
 Bye Bye Beautiful (DJ Orkidea remix)

B-side tracks
"Amaranth" single
 "Reach" (Amaranth demo version) – 3:57
 "Eva" (demo version) – 4:18
 "Amaranth" (orchestral version) – 3:51
 "Eva" (orchestral version) – 4:28
 "While Your Lips Are Still Red" – 4:22

"Erämaan viimeinen" single
 "Erämaan viimeinen" – 5:10

"Bye Bye Beautiful" single
 "The Poet and the Pendulum" (demo version) – 13:41
 "Bye Bye Beautiful" (DJ Orkidea remix) – 12:14
 "Escapist" – 4:57

"The Islander" single
 "The Islander" (radio edit) – 3:57
 "Meadows of Heaven" (orchestral version) – 7:14
 "Escapist" (instrumental version) – 4:57

Exclusive digital album
Roadrunner Records released a digital only album called The Sound of Nightwish Reborn on September 2, 2008. The track list is composed of demos and b-sides from Dark Passion Play.

 Escapist
 Reach ("Amaranth" demo)
 Eva (demo version)
 While Your Lips Are Still Red
 The Poet and the Pendulum (demo version)
 Amaranth (orchestral version)
 Eva (orchestral version)
 Bye Bye Beautiful (DJ Orkidea remix)
 Meadows of Heaven (orchestral version)

References

External links
 Nightwish's Official Website

Nightwish